Amercedes is a genus of flower weevils in the beetle family Curculionidae. There are at least three described species in Amercedes.

Species
These three species belong to the genus Amercedes:
 Amercedes orthorrhinus Champion & G.C., 1909
 Amercedes schwarzi Hustache & A., 1938
 Amercedes subulirostris Casey, 1894

References

Further reading

 
 
 

Baridinae
Articles created by Qbugbot